This is the discography of Singaporean singer Kelvin Tan

Singles

Studio albums

VCDs/DVDs

Compilations

Notes
a. Single's sales determine Kelvin's possibility of being Project SuperStar champion

Discographies of Singaporean artists
Pop music discographies